The Carolina Mudcats are a Minor League Baseball team of the Carolina League and the Single-A affiliate of the Milwaukee Brewers. They are located in Zebulon, North Carolina, a suburb of Raleigh, and play their home games at Five County Stadium. "Mudcats" is Southern slang for catfish. 

The team began play in 1991 after the Columbus Mudcats relocated from Columbus, Georgia. They were members of the Double-A Southern League through 2011. The Mudcats were replaced by a Class A-Advanced team of the Carolina League in 2012. This team carried on as an extension of the previous club. Carolina was dropped to the Low-A classification and placed in the Low-A East in 2021, though this was renamed the Carolina League and reclassified as Single-A in 2022.

The Mudcats won the Southern League championship in 1995 as the Double-A affiliate of the Pittsburgh Pirates and in 2003 as the Double-A affiliate of the Florida Marlins.

History

Before Carolina
The Mudcats came to Zebulon, North Carolina, by way of Columbus, Georgia. From 1969 to 1990, Columbus was home to the Double-A Southern League's Columbus Mudcats. Following the 1990 season, team owner Steve Bryant relocated the club to the Raleigh suburb of Zebulon, where it continued in the Southern League as the Carolina Mudcats. The team played at Five County Stadium, which was named for its location near the convergence of five counties: Wake, Nash, Johnston, Franklin, and Wilson. The stadium was as close to Raleigh as it could get without infringing on the territorial rights of the then Class A (now Triple-A) Durham Bulls.

Pittsburgh Pirates (1991–1998)

As the Double-A affiliate of the Pittsburgh Pirates, the Carolina Mudcats played their first game on April 11, 1991, on the road against the Greenville Braves at Greenville Municipal Stadium in Greenville, South Carolina, losing, 1–0. They earned their first win the next evening, defeating Greenville, 7–3. While work on Five County Stadium continued, the Mudcats opened their home schedule at Fleming Stadium in Wilson on April 19. They won their home opener over Greenville, 5–1, before 4,357 people. Initially delayed because of rain, the game was called in the eighth inning with Mudcats starting pitcher Tim Wakefield earning the win after allowing only one run on four hits over seven innings. Their first game at Five County Stadium was played on July 3. A standing-room-only crowd of 7,333 witnessed a 6–1 defeat by the Braves.

The Southern League used a split-season schedule wherein the division winners from each half qualified for the postseason championship playoffs. Carolina did not win either half of their inaugural season. Overall, the Mudcats finished their first season with a 66–76 win–loss record. The team posted a franchise-low 52–92 record in 1992. After their first winning campaign in 1993, the 1994 Mudcats won the First Half Eastern Division title and then beat Greenville, 3–2, to claim the Eastern Division title and a place in the league championship series. They were defeated in the finals by the Western Division champion Huntsville Stars, 3–1. First baseman Mark Johnson, who led the circuit with 23 home runs. was selected as the Southern League Most Valuable Player (MVP).

Managed by Trent Jewett, Carolina won both halves of the 1995 season, sending them back to the playoffs with a franchise-best 89–55 campaign. They won the Eastern Division title versus the Orlando Cubs, 3–2, before winning their first Southern League championship over the Chattanooga Lookouts, 3–2. Catcher Jason Kendall was selected for the league MVP Award. The Mudcats qualified for the 1996 playoffs via a wild card berth but were eliminated in the Eastern Division series by the Jacksonville Suns, 3–2. The next two Carolina teams finished with sub-.500 records. The Mudcats' affiliation with the Pirates ended after the 1998 season. Over eight years with Pittsburgh, Carolina held a regular season record of 539–587.

Colorado Rockies (1999–2002)
Carolina became the Double-A affiliate of the Colorado Rockies in 1999. The team incurred losing records in each of the first three seasons of the partnership. In 2002, the Mudcats won the First Half Eastern Division title, but they lost the Eastern Division crown to Jacksonville, 3–2. The affiliation ended after four years with Carolina going 251–302 in the regular season over that stretch.

Florida Marlins (2003–2008)
The Mudcats joined the Florida Marlins organization in 2003 as their Double-A affiliate. In the first season of the partnership, manager Tracy Woodson led Carolina to win both halves of the season and the Eastern Division title versus the Tennessee Smokies, 3–1. The Mudcats then won their second Southern League championship over Huntsville, 3–2. The team returned to the playoffs with a wild card berth in 2005, but they were swept out of the division series, 3–0, by the West Tenn Diamond Jaxx.

Carolina won the Second Half Northern Division title in 2008 and defeated West Tenn in a three-game sweep to advance to the Southern League finals. In a full five-game series, the Mudcats lost the league championship to the Mississippi Braves, 3–2. Gaby Sánchez, a Carolina first and third baseman who led the league with 42 doubles, was selected as the Southern League MVP. The six-year affiliation with Florida came to an end after the 2008 campaign.  Carolina's record over that time was 431–400.

Cincinnati Reds (2009–2011)

The Mudcats became the Double-A affiliate of the Cincinnati Reds in 2009. With losing records, the team missed out on playoff spots in each of their three seasons with the Reds. Two players, however, were selected for league year-end awards. Pitcher Travis Wood received the Southern League Most Outstanding Pitcher Award in 2009. Center fielder Dave Sappelt, who had a league-leading .361 batting average, won the MVP Award in 2010. Over three years with Cincinnati, the Mudcats went 176–239.

In December 2010, team owner Steve Bryant sold his Southern League franchise to businessman Quint Studer and his wife, Rishy, who planned to relocate the team to Pensacola, Florida, as the Pensacola Blue Wahoos in 2012. In a corresponding move, the Studers facilitated Bryant's purchase of the Kinston Indians of the Class A-Advanced Carolina League. As the Southern League franchise departed for Pensacola after the 2011 season, the Carolina League franchise moved to Zebulon and continued as the Mudcats at Class A-Advanced.

Cleveland Indians (2012–2014)
Upon joining the Carolina League in 2012, the Mudcats became the Class A-Advanced affiliate of the Cleveland Indians in a continuation of their previous relationship with Kinston. Their new league used the same split-season format as the Southern League. Carolina posted losing records in each season of the three-year run with Cleveland without qualifying for the playoffs. They went 182–234 over this period. In 2013, pitcher Cody Anderson, who led the league with a 2.34 earned run average, won the Carolina League Pitcher of the Year Award and the league's Community Service Award.

Atlanta Braves (2015–2016)
The Mudcats' next affiliate was the Atlanta Braves. The partnership began in 2015 with the team experiencing its first winning season (71–68) since 2008. They finished 35 games under .500 in 2016, the last year of the affiliation, giving them a cumulative two-year record of 123–155.

Milwaukee Brewers (2017–present)
The Mudcats became the Class A-Advanced affiliate of the Milwaukee Brewers in 2017. The team narrowly missed the playoffs in their first year with the Brewers with a 73–65 record. In October 2017, team owner Steve Bryant sold his majority interest in the Mudcats to the Brewers. In 2019, catcher Mario Feliciano won the Carolina League Most Valuable Player Award; he led the league with 19 home runs, 78 RBI, and a .476 slugging percentage at the time of the award. Starter Noah Zavolas won the Pitcher of the Year Award; he held a league-best 1.14 WHIP at the time.

The start of the 2020 season was postponed due to the COVID-19 pandemic before being cancelled on June 30. Following the 2020 season, Major League Baseball assumed control of Minor League Baseball in a move to increase player salaries, modernize facility standards, and reduce travel. As a result, the Brewers' Class A affiliate, the Wisconsin Timber Rattlers, was moved up to High-A. Consequently, the Mudcats were shifted to the Low-A classification as members of the Low-A East but kept their affiliation with Milwaukee. Carolina began competition in the new league on May 4 with a 6–5 victory over the Fayetteville Woodpeckers at Five County Stadium. The Mudcats placed second in the Central Division at 68–52 after their first season in the Low-A East.

In 2022, the Low-A East became known as the Carolina League, the name historically used by the regional circuit prior to the 2021 reorganization, and was reclassified as a Single-A circuit. The Mudcats finished the first-half in second place, one game behind the division winner. They placed second in the second-half but further back. Overall, Carolina had a 69–62 record. Outfielder Jackson Chourio was voted the Carolina League MVP and won the league's Top MLB Prospect Award. Over five complete seasons of competition as a Brewers farm club, the Mudcats hold a win–loss record of 340–326.

Season-by-season records

Roster

Awards

Nine players and one executive have won league awards in recognition for their performance with the Mudcats.

References

External links

 
 Statistics from Baseball-Reference (1991–2011)
 Statistics from Baseball-Reference (2012–present)
 Statistics from Stats Crew

1991 establishments in North Carolina
Atlanta Braves minor league affiliates
Baseball teams established in 1991
Cincinnati Reds minor league affiliates
Cleveland Guardians minor league affiliates
Colorado Rockies minor league affiliates
Carolina League teams
Southern League (1964–present) teams
Miami Marlins minor league affiliates
Milwaukee Brewers minor league affiliates
Pittsburgh Pirates minor league affiliates
Professional baseball teams in North Carolina
Sports in Raleigh-Durham